Kacha Khuh railway station, (Punjabi ) is located in Kacha Khuh village, Khanewal district of Punjab province of the Pakistan.

See also
 List of railway stations in Pakistan
 Pakistan Railways

References

External links

Railway stations in Khanewal District
Railway stations on Karachi–Peshawar Line (ML 1)